A watchnight service (also called Watchnight Mass) is a late-night Christian church service. In many different Christian traditions, such as those of Moravians, Methodists, Catholics, Lutherans, Anglicans, Baptists, Adventists and Reformed Christians, watchnight services are held late on New Year's Eve, which is the seventh day of Christmastide. This provides the opportunity for Christians to review the year that has passed and make confession, and then prepare for the year ahead by praying and resolving. The services often include singing, praying, exhorting, preaching, and Holy Communion.

Watchnight services can take the form of Watchnight Covenant Renewal Services, Watchnight Vespers services, Watchnight Vigil services, or Watchnight Masses. As Watchnight services bring in the New Year by glorifying God, they are seen by many Christians as being preferable to "drunken revelry" in popular cultural celebrations that are commonplace in some localities.

In addition to Christian denominational traditions, the ethnic traditions of Koreans and African Americans have a strong tradition of New Year's Eve watchnight services.

History
The Bible documents that at the time of the Exodus from Egypt, God ordered Moses to "set up the tabernacle of the tent of the congregation" on "the first day of the first month".

In Christianity, since the time of the early Church, Christians have held vigils (watchnights) before the celebration of feast days, a practice "inspired by Jesus's example of praying all night before important decisions." At that time, non-Christians of the Greco-Roman world observed the arrival of the New Year with "revelling" and Christians distinguished themselves by instead praying and fasting.

Throughout history, Christian denominations including the Catholic Church, Lutheran Church and Anglican Church have variously observed the eighth day of Christmastide—New Year's Day—as the Feast of the Circumcision of Christ, Feast of the Holy Name and Solemnity of Mary, Mother of God, with the evening before having the Vigil Mass (Watchnight Mass) for the feast.

The Moravian Church came to hold a lovefeast on New Year's Eve, followed by a watchnight service in the evening. These watchnight services last three hours and have been held since they became popular in the Czech Republic in 1733.

After attending a Moravian watchnight service on New Year's Eve in 1738, John Wesley, the father of the Methodist Churches, recorded that "as we were continuing instant in prayer, the power of God came mightily upon us, insomuch that many cried for exceeding joy, and many fell to the ground." The Methodist Churches, strongly influenced by the Moravian Church and Radical Pietism in general, herald the practice of the Watchnight Service, with John Wesley having emphasized that it was "customary with the ancient Christians to spend whole nights in prayer". 

The practice of holding watchnight services on New Year's Eve became ubiquitous throughout Christendom, with many Christian denominations now offering them.

By Christian denomination

Moravianism
In the Moravian Church, congregations observe a watchnight service on New Year's Eve, which is preceded by the celebration of the lovefeast. The three-hour watchnight service of Moravian Christians traces back to at least 1733.

Methodism

Following the lead of the Moravian Brethren who began having "watch" services in 1733, the founder of the Methodist Church, John Wesley, adopted watch night services in 1740, sometimes calling them Covenant Renewal Services. The services provided Methodist Christians with a godly alternative to times of drunken revelry, including New Year's Eve. Today, a Methodist watchnight service includes singing, spontaneous prayers and testimonials, as well as scripture readings and Holy Communion; the liturgy for this service, which is held on New Year's Eve, is found in Methodist liturgical books, such as The United Methodist Book of Worship.

Lutheranism
In the Lutheran Churches, Watchnight Masses are celebrated with the purpose of "welcoming the new year with praises to Almighty God."

Catholicism
In Roman Rite Catholic churches, Mass is held on New Year's Eve/New Year's Day around midnight; these are sometimes called the "Watch Night Mass" or "Watchnight Mass". The Archdiocese of Nassau has watchnight services at parishes throughout the ecclesiastical territory.

Anglicanism
Many Anglican parishes hold watchnight services, including several cathedrals, among them being Ripon Cathedral, St Andrew's Cathedral, Singapore and Cathedral Church of Christ, Lagos.

The Protestant Episcopal Church in the United States of America contains a liturgy for the Watchnight Service in The Book of Occasional Services.
 In The Living Church, Fr. William M. Lawbaugh stated that "Watchnight Services on New Year’s Eve have a lot to offer the Episcopal Church, not only to dispel the ugly notions of alcohol abuse but also to reform ourselves." The Anglican watchnight service includes "lessons, psalms, and collects" as well as Holy Communion.

Presbyterianism
In the Presbyterian Churches, watchnight services are held on New Year's Eve (Hogmanay); they often include the singing of hymns and the sharing of testimonies by congregants, such as how God has blessed them that year. St Cuthbert's Church, Edinburgh, a parish of the Church of Scotland, is known for its New Year's Eve watchnight service. In the Church of Scotland, a Watchnight service also refers to a popular ceremony marking the beginning of Christmas Day.

Congregationalism
In many Congregationalist Churches, such as the United Church of Christ, watchnight services are held on the night of New Year's Eve.

Continental Reformed
The Continental Reformed Churches, such as parishes of the United Reformed Church, offer Watchight Services on New Year's Eve.

Baptists
Watchnight services are held on New Year's Eve in many Baptist churches, with a focus on "renewed consecration and drawing nearer to the Saviour".

Adventism
In Adventist churches, watchnight services are celebrated on New Year's Eve with "testimonies, praise songs, [and] psalms" in order to "give God thanks for keeping us through a trying year and asking his guidance as we anticipate the new year and Him leading us in that period".

Pentecostalism
Many Pentecostal churches hold watchnight services in the late hours of New Year's Eve.

Ethnic traditions

African Americans

African-American Methodists long celebrated watchnight services as Methodist parishes in the United States, such as St. George's United Methodist Church and Mother Bethel A.M.E. Church, held them on New Year's Eve in accordance with Methodist customs. Watchnight services gained additional significance and history in the Black churches in the United States, since many African Americans were said to have gathered in churches on New Year's Eve in 1862, on what was called Freedom's Eve, to await the hour when President Abraham Lincoln's Emancipation Proclamation was to take effect on January 1, 1863. As such, watchnight services in the Black Church are widely attended.

Korean community
Korean Christians have a strong tradition of watchnight services on New Year's Eve.

See also 

New Year's resolution

References

External links

Liturgy for Watchnight Service
Covenant Renewal Service for Watchnight on New Year's Eve
Video: Watchnight Service at Fairview Moravian Church
Video: Watchnight Covenant Renewal Service at Trinity Methodist Church
Video: Watchnight Service at St. Agnes Anglican Church
Video: Watchnight Service at Trinity Mar Thoma Church
Video: Watchnight Mass at Sacred Heart Catholic Church
Video: Watchnight Service at Maze Presbyterian Church

Christian worship and liturgy
New Year celebrations